Khunik Zirak (also Romanized as Khūnīk Zīrak; also known as Khūnīk and Khūnīk-e Zīrg) is a village in Kahshang Rural District, in the Central District of Birjand County, South Khorasan Province, Iran. At the 2016 census, its population was 88, in 32 families.

References 

Populated places in Birjand County